Hayes Island Snack Bar is located on The Hayes in the centre of Cardiff, Wales. It was built as a parcel depot for Cardiff Corporation Tramways in 1911. Closed in 1942, the kiosk was redeveloped as a snack bar which opened in 1948. It is described as the oldest operating snack bar in Wales. Since 2013 it has been operated by the Worton family, under licence from Cardiff Council. The kiosk is a Grade II listed building. The adjacent Ladies' and Gentlemen's toilets date from 1898 and were the first public conveniences in Cardiff. The toilets, and the two contemporary lamposts, are also Grade II listed.

History
The Hayes forms a rectangular space in the centre of Cardiff, bounded to the east by St David's Hall and to the west by the former David Morgan's department store. At its, triangular, northern end, a pedestrian space forms Hayes Island, the location of the snack bar, and of a statue of John Batchelor, a Victorian Mayor of Cardiff. In the early 20th century, Cardiff Corporation Tramways was established to operate electric trams throughout the city, replacing the previous horse tram system. In addition to passenger services, the Corporation operated an extensive parcel distribution service. The Hayes Island Snack Bar was built in 1911 as a parcels depot. It continued in use until 1942, when the parcel service ceased. In 1949, the structure was redeveloped and reopened as a snack bar. It continues in operation and in 2018 celebrated its 70th anniversary as the oldest operating snack bar in Wales and an “unmistakeable Cardiff landmark.”

The Ladies' and Gentlemen's Toilets date from 1898 and were the first public conveniences in Cardiff. Closed due to budget cuts in 2013, they were reopened in 2014 and are operated by the Worton family, licensees of the snack bar, under arrangement with Cardiff Council.

Architecture and description
The snack bar is of timber construction, the woodwork being original, although the roof has been replaced. The ends of the structure are gabled with scallop designs, a motif also used on the overhanging canopy. The kiosk is a Grade II listed building. The toilets have original Victorian fittings, decorations and railings and are also listed Grade II. The lampposts are contemporary with the toilets and have their own Grade II designations. Cadw's listing record for the snack bar notes its importance as "a rare survival of Cardiff's tramway system" and its "group value with other listed buildings at Hayes Island."

Notes

References

Sources
 

Landmarks in Cardiff
Grade II listed buildings in Cardiff
Buildings and structures in Cardiff